Armageddon Dildos is a German electro-industrial-duo originally consisting of Uwe Kanka (vocals) and Dirk Krause (synthesizer). The act was formed in 1988 in Kassel Germany, and the name comes from the slang term for intercontinental ballistic missiles. They perform songs in both German and English.

The Armageddon Dildos have been popular within their native Germany. Outside of Germany they have a cult following among industrial music lovers. In the United States their music has had some airtime on experimental music radio stations. They have been compared to bands like Rammstein, Front 242, Nitzer Ebb, Ministry, Revolting Cocks, Einstürzende Neubauten, and Coil.

History

Uwe Kanka and Dirk Krause met and began working together as early as 1986 in Kassel, Germany. The pair met in a shared rehearsal space where Krause was working with a synthpop band and Kanka was with a new wave band called Beat The Beat. It soon became clear that the duo wanted to work together on music that was more electronic and aggressive, which eventually led them to Music Research and Talla 2XLC (Andreas Tomalla). Armageddon Dildos were one of the first acts on the Music research imprint Zoth Ommog Records, alongside other significant acts such as Leæther Strip, X Marks the Pedwalk, and Tomalla's own band, Bigod 20.

In 1990, the band released their first single, "East West," followed in 1991 by their first album That's Armageddon. These were followed by album singles "Never Mind" and "Resist." In 1993, the band released the single "Homicidal Maniac" which added a layer of guitar to their otherwise all-electronic sound.

Prior to 1993, Tomalla's band Bigod 20 had scored a hit with the track "The Bog," which led to a major label deal with Sire Records. In 1993, Tomalla used this relationship to arrange a deal with Sire for Armageddon Dildos. Sire released "Homicidal Maniac" in the US as a prelude to their next album Homicidal Dolls.

In 1994, the band covered fellow Sire artist Morrissey's "Everyday Is Like Sunday," released as the maxi-single, Come Armageddon. The cover was suggested by the label as a tongue-in-cheek take on the song's lyric, "come, armageddon, come."

By this point, the band had toured across Europe, including Germany, Hungary, Sweden, Spain, Holland, Italy, and France, and two shows in the US at the New Music Seminar in New York City.

In May 1994, the band went to Chicago to record the album Lost with producer Keith "Fluffy" Auerbach. The album featured guitar work by Skatenigs guitarist Mat Mitchell and percussion by Felix Miklik of Hip Deep Trilogy and Drag. Commenting on the Chicago recording session, Kanka said "we got what we came for, an American sound." The album made an appearance on the CMJ RPM charts, peaking at #21. Lost and the album single "Too Far To Suicide" would be the band's last releases on Sire.

The band released a couple of singles, "Unite" and "We Are What We Are," before landing a deal with Bertelsmann Music Group in 1997. Under BMG, the group released a new album, Speed, and two singles. The duo closed out the 1990s with the album Re:Match and a remix maxi of "East West" as Eastwest 2000, both released by Zoth Ommog.

In 2000, Krause left the group leaving Kanka to continue on his own. In the early 2000s, Kanka released a pair of Armageddon Dildos albums on Ausfahrt/Electric Blue, Morgengrauen in 2003 and Sangreal in 2005.

In April 2007 the band embarked on a US tour, marking the band's first live dates in North America in more than a decade.

In 2011, Armageddon Dildos signed with Alfa Matrix and released their first album in six years: Untergrund. On Untergrund, Kanka worked with producer Mattias Black, as well as musicians Rene Nowotny and Ulf Häusgen and Kanka's daughter Denise (aka Malin) on guest vocals.

After several more years, the band released the single "Herbstzeitlose" in 2018, followed by the single "Heut Nacht" and album Dystopia in 2020.

Discography

Albums
That’s Armageddon – (CD Album) 1991 - Zoth Ommog
Homicidal Dolls – (CD Album) 1993 - Zoth Ommog, Sire Records
Lost – (CD Album) 1994 - Zoth Ommog • (CD) 1995 - Sire Records
07 104 – (CD Compilation) 1994 - Zoth Ommog, Semaphore
Speed – (CD Album) 1997 - BMG, RCA
Re:Match – (CD Album) 1999 - Zoth Ommog
Morgengrauen – (CD Album) 2003 - Electric Blue
Sangreal – (CD Album) 2005 - Ausfahrt
Untergrund – (CD Album) 2011 - Alfa Matrix
Dystopia – (CD Album) 2020 - Alfa Matrix

Singles & EPs
East West – (12") 1990 - Zoth Ommog
Never Mind/Pressure – (12") 1990 - Zoth Ommog
Resist – (12") 1991 - Zoth Ommog
Homicidal Maniac – (12", CD Maxi) 1992 - Zoth Ommog • (12", CD Maxi) 1993 - Sire Records
Fear – (CD EP) 1993 - Zoth Ommog
Come Armageddon – (12", CD Maxi) 1994 - Sire Records
Too Far To Suicide – (CD Maxi) 1994 Zoth Ommog • (CS Single) 1995 - Sire Records
Unite – (CD Maxi) 1995 - Zoth Ommog
We Are What We Are – (12", CD Single) 1996 - Metronome
Blue Light – (CD Maxi) 1997 - RCA
Open Up Your Eyes – (CD Maxi) 1997 - BMG Ariola Hamburg GmbH, RCA
Eastwest 2000 – (CD Maxi) 1999 - Zoth Ommog
Herbstzeitlose – (Digital) 2018 - Alfa Matrix
Heut Nacht – (Digital) 2020 - Alfa Matrix

Compilation appearances

Body Rapture – 1990 - "Raise Your Head" - Zoth Ommog
Metropolis 00.01 – 1990 - "East West (Metropolis Mix)" - Metropolis (defunct DJ label)
Technopolis 2 – 1990 - "East West (Metropolis Mix)" - New Zone
Technopolis 3 – 1991 - "Resist (Demonstrate Mix)" - New Zone
The World of Techno – 1991 - "Never Mind" - Intercord Tonträger GmbH
The World of Techno Compilation – 1991 - "Never Mind" - Blow Up
Twitch Recordings Volume 3 – 1991 - "Resist (Remix Mike Wertheim)" - Twitch Recordings
For Crying Out Loud Chapter 2 – 1992 - "Resist" and Track #2 "Sex For Money" - FCOL
The World of Techno Vol. 2 – 1992 - "Frontline of Violence" - Intercord Tonträger GmbH
The World of Techno Volume 2 – 1992 - "Frontline of Violence" - Blow Up
Zoth In Your Mind – 1993 - "Homicidal Maniac (Crash Head Mix)" - Zoth Ommog
A Matter of Taste - Intercord PopKomm Compilation 1994 – 1994 - "Too Far To Suicide (Radio Edit)" - Intercord Tonträger GmbH
Art & Dance 5 – 1994 - "The Hunter" - Gothic Arts Records/Lost Paradise
Moonraker – 1994 - "Homicidal Maniac (Video Mix)" - Sub Terranean
The Colours of Zoth Ommog – 1994 - "I Can't Remember" - Zoth Ommog
Totentanz - The Best of Zoth Ommog – 1994 - "Resist (Lard Mix)" and "Frontline of Violence" - Cleopatra
We Came to Dance - Indie Dancefloor Vol. IV – 1994 - "The Hunter" - Sub Terranean
Alternative Final Mix 11 – 1995 - "Too Far To Suicide" - Warner Music (Australia)
Best Of Zoth Ommog Vol. 1 – 1995 - "East West" and "Never Mind" - Zoth Ommog
Colourized Vol. 1 - Cyber Rave & Hard Floor Metal – 1995 - "Unite (Remix)" - Zoth Ommog
E-Beat – 1995 - "Unite" - Polymedia Marketing Group GmbH
Demolition Zoth – 1996 - "East West Edit" - Cleopatra
Guitars & Machines Vol. 2 – 1996 - "In My Mind (Like A Knife)" - Blanco Y Negro
Sounds Of 96 Vol. 3 – 1996 - "We Are What We Are" - Musikexpress
The Digital Space Between Vol. 3 – 1996 - "Uncle D." - Cleopatra
GötterDÄmmerung – 1997 - "Ich Weiß Nicht (Ob Es Liebe Ist...)" - Gringo Records, Intercord Tonträger GmbH
Off Road Tracks Vol. 5 – 1997 - "Guilty" - Metal Hammer (Germany)
The History Files - Volume One – 1997 - "East West (Dildo Effect Mix)", "In My Mind (Like A Knife...)", "East West (Airplay Mix)" and "Z.O.D." - Zoth Ommog
Totentanz Vol. II - The History of Zoth Ommog – 1997 - "East West" and "Never Mind" - Zoth Ommog
German Classics Electrobeats – 1998 - "Haut (Krupps Mix)" - TCM Musikproduktionsgesellschaft mbH
10 Years of Zoth Ommog – 1999 - "Never Mind (New 99 Version)" and "Never Mind (Original Version) - Zoth Ommog
Bodyhorst's Popshow 3 – 1999 - "In My Mind (2000 Remix)" - Bodystyler Magazine
Cover Classics Volume One – 1999 - "Everyday Is Like Sunday" - Synthetic Symphony
Electrocity Vol. 12 – 1999 - "Resist 2000" - Ausfahrt
Music Research Promotional CD Pop.komm '99 Zoth Ommog – 1999 - "2000 In My Mind" - Zoth Ommog
Straight Shooter (Original Soundtrack) – 1999 - "Straight Shooter" - EastWest Records GmbH
The Complete History of Zoth Ommog: Totentanz – 1999 - "Frontline of Violence" and "Godshit (Re-Possessed Relievo Version)" - Cleopatra
We Came to Watch Part 2 – 1999 - "Homicidal Maniac" - Credo, Nova Tekk
ZilloScope: New Signs & Sounds 07-08/99 – 1999 - "In My Mind (Version 2000)" - Zillo
Cyberl@b V2.0 – 2000 - "In My Mind 2000" - Matrix Cube
N.O.D. The Final Sessions – 2000 - "Resist" - Energy Network
Cyberl@b V.4.0 – 2003 - "Traurige Nation" - Alfa Matrix
Sonic Seducer Cold Hands Seduction Vol. 28 – 2003 - "Morgengrauen" - Sonic Seducer
Electrocity XIII – 2003 - "Morgengrauen" - Ausfahrt
Bright Lights, Dark Room: Depeche Mode Tribute – 2006 - "Dangerous" - Cryonica Music
XX-Ray – 2008 - Appearing as 'Sara Noxx  Feat. Armageddon Dildos', "Your Face In My Brain" - Prussia Records

References

External links

 artist information/discography page at CyberNoise
 
 Armageddon Dildos at Discogs

Electronic body music groups
German musical groups
Musical groups established in 1988
Zoth Ommog Records artists
Sire Records artists